The Bundeshaus (Federal House) is a building in the district of Wilmersdorf in Berlin, Germany that is the domicile of Federal Government agencies in Berlin, among others the Federal Office of Administration.

History 
It was built between 1893 and 1895 and first served as an administrative building for the Royal Prussian Artillery Testing Commission.  After partial destruction during World War II, it was restored and re-opened by the West German Federal Chancellor Konrad Adenauer on 17 April 1950. Between 1950 and 1990 it served as the seat of the Federal Plenipotentiary (Bundesbevollmächtigter), Bonn's representative in the city of West Berlin and as the West Berlin outpost of several federal government agencies, some of which have completely moved to Berlin in separate buildings since the reunification.

Berlin Memorial Plaque
 On 19 July 1990, a Berlin Memorial Plaque commemorating the Generals Erich Hoepner and Henning von Tresckow, who worked in the building, was unveiled in the building.

External links
 
 Bundeshaus at Berlin.de

Buildings and structures in Berlin